The following television stations broadcast on digital channel 27 in Mexico:

 XHBAB-TDT in Bahía Asunción, Baja California Sur 
 XHBF-TDT in Navojoa, Sonora 
 XHBG-TDT in Uruapan, Michoacán de Ocampo
 XHBJ-TDT in Tijuana, Baja California
 XHCHF-TDT in Chetumal, Quintana Roo
 XHCHW-TDT in Ciudad Acuña, Coahuila
 XHCOC-TDT in Ciudad Constitución, Baja California Sur 
 XHCOV-TDT in Coatzacoalcos, Veracruz de Ignacio de la Llave
 XHCPPV-TDT in Puerto Vallarta, Jalisco
 XHCPZ-TDT in Sombrerete, Zacatecas 
 XHCTCO-TDT in Colima, Colima
 XHCTCR-TDT in Tuxtla Gutiérrez, Chiapas
 XHCTZA-TDT in Zacatecas, Zacatecas
 XHCUR-TDT in Cuernavaca, Morelos
 XHECA-TDT in Escárcega, Campeche 
 XHFRT-TDT in Frontera, Tabasco 
 XHGVK-TDT in Victoria, Guanajuato 
 XHHUH-TDT in Huejutla de Reyes, Hidalgo 
 XHIZG-TDT in Ixtapa-Zihuatanejo, Guerrero 
 XHKD-TDT in Ciudad Valles, San Luis Potosí 
 XHLGT-TDT in León, Guanajuato
 XHMLA-TDT in Monclova, Coahuila de Zaragoza
 XHMSI-TDT in Los Mochis, Sinaloa 
 XHNCG-TDT in Nuevo Casas Grandes, Chihuahua 
 XHOMC-TDT in Arriaga, Chiapas 
 XHOXX-TDT in Oaxaca, Oaxaca 
 XHPAP-TDT in Santiago Papasquiaro, Durango 
 XHQRO-TDT in Cancún, Quintana Roo
 XHRTNA-TDT in Acaponeta-Tecuala, Nayarit
 XHSCJ-TDT in Santa Catarina Juquila, Oaxaca 
 XHSJT-TDT in San José Del Cabo, Baja California Sur
 XHSPRHA-TDT in Hermosillo, Sonora 
 XHTEM-TDT in Puebla, Puebla
 XHTMCA-TDT in Campeche, Campeche
 XHTMYU-TDT in Valladolid-Tizimín, Yucatán
 XHTRES-TDT in México City
 XHUDG-TDT in Guadalajara, Jalisco
 XHXEM-TDT in Jocotitlán, México 

27